Chrome Island Lighthouse is a light station established in 1891 that assists traffic in the region of Deep Bay, British Columbia, Denman Island, and Hornby Island.  It is currently a manned station, though in recent years the Canadian Coast Guard has considered converting it to fully automated status.

The station has a helicopter landing deck and rescue boat.

The Chrome Island light is one of 12 lighthouses part of the British Columbia Shore Station Oceanographic Program, collecting coastal water temperature and salinity measurements for the Department of Fisheries and Oceans everyday since 1961.

Keepers 
 Tom H. Piercy 1891–1898
 William McDonagh 1898–1901
 Walter Gordon 1901–1906
 John Doney 1906–1914
 James Fredrick Street 1914–1917
 Albert Doney 1917–1919
 Daniel O'Brien 1919–1922
 G. Allan Couldery 1922–1939
 Eugene Alexander Moden 1939–1953
 Oscar Edwards 1953–1957
 D.P. Gardner 1957–1960
 Jim W. Bruton 1960–1964
 William Edward Gardiner 1964–1977
 Maurice Collette 1977–1979
 Gerald Watson 1979–1980
 Terrance Stewart 1980–1985
 Charles Thomson 1986–1997
 Barry Shaw 1997–1998
 Charles Thomson 1998–2007
 Roger Williamson 2007–present

See also 
 List of lighthouses in British Columbia
 List of lighthouses in Canada

References

External links 

 Chrome Island Light Lighthousefriends.com
 Lighthouses of British Columbia
 Aids to Navigation Canadian Coast Guard
 

Lighthouses completed in 1891
Lighthouses in British Columbia
1891 establishments in British Columbia